Maksim Vladimirovich Pavlov (born 26 May 1989) is a Russian former professional football player.

Club career
He made his Russian Football National League debut for FC KAMAZ Naberezhnye Chelny on 11 July 2015 in a game against FC Gazovik Orenburg.

External links
 
 

1989 births
Sportspeople from Tolyatti
Living people
Russian footballers
Association football goalkeepers
FC Lada-Tolyatti players
FC KAMAZ Naberezhnye Chelny players
PFC Krylia Sovetov Samara players
FC Volga Ulyanovsk players